Ultraviolet is a novelization of the science fiction film of the same name. It was adapted by Yvonne Navarro from the screenplay written by Kurt Wimmer. The novelization provides more backstory that the film was not able to accomplish. The novel is also based on the original screenplay by Kurt Wimmer before Sony heavily edited it.

External links 
 Official Ultraviolet Website
 

2006 American novels
American science fiction novels
Dystopian novels
Novels based on films
Superhero novels